The World's News was a newspaper published in Sydney, Australia from 1901 to 1955.

History
The World's News was first published on 21 December 1901 by Watkin Wynne.

Digitisation
This paper has been digitised as part of the Australian Newspapers Digitisation Program project of the National Library of Australia.

See also
 List of newspapers in Australia
 List of newspapers in New South Wales

References

External links
 

Defunct newspapers published in Sydney